The 1907–08 WPHL season was the eighth season of operation for the Western Pennsylvania Hockey League (WPHL) and the first since the league went dormant in 1904. In the intervening three seasons, a team representing Pittsburgh competed in the International Professional Hockey League (IPHL). Four Pittsburgh-area teams made up the revived WPHL, in which all games were played at the Duquesne Gardens. Old WPHL teams Pittsburgh Athletic Club and the Pittsburgh Bankers resumed play in the league. Two teams were added to the league, the Pittsburgh Pirates and a team representing the Pittsburgh Lyceum.

Regular season
The season concluded with the Pittsburgh Bankers having the best record in the league and being named league champions. It was the team's second league title.

The season saw some of the first, if not the first, recorded trades involving professional hockey players. The Bankers traded Dutch Koch to Lyceum for Harry Burgoyne in December 1907, then in early January reacquired Koch from Lyceum in exchange for Fred Young. A bigger trade took place on January 27, with the Pittsburgh Pirates sending James MacKay, Edgar Dey and Dunc Taylor to the Bankers in exchange for Joseph Donnelly and Bert Bennett. On January 31 the Pirates also acquired Gordon McGuire from the Bankers through a purchase.

Final standings

Source: Fitzsimmons, p. 415
 Games that resulted in a tie were replayed and are not reflected in total points

Exhibition
The Bankers played a "World's Series" with the Montreal Wanderers. The Wanderers won the series two games to one.

References
Citations

Bibliography

 

Western Pennsylvania Hockey League seasons
WPHL